"Riding in the TT Races" is a 1935 British song written by George Formby, Harry Gifford and Frederick E. Cliffe. The film is featured in the 1935 film, No Limit, in which Formby's character takes part in the TT Races on the Isle of Man.  Formby recorded it on  28 November 1935 for Regal Zonophone Records.

References

Bibliography
 St. Pierre, Paul Matthew. Music Hall Mimesis in British Film, 1895-1960: On the Halls on the Screen. Associated University Presse, 2009. 

British songs
1935 songs
George Formby songs
Songs written by George Formby
Songs written by Fred E. Cliffe
Songs written by Harry Gifford (songwriter)